A comal is a smooth, flat griddle typically used in Mexico, Central America, and parts of South America, to cook tortillas and arepas, toast spices and nuts, sear meat, and generally prepare food. Similar cookware is called a budare in South America. Some comals are concave and made of barro (clay). These are still made and used by the indigenous peoples of Mexico and Central America. Comals are similar to the American griddle or the Indian tawa, and are often used and named interchangeably with these.

Comals for home use are generally made from heavy cast iron, and sized to fit over either one burner on the stovetop (round) or two burners front to back (elongated oval). In many indigenous and pre-Hispanic cultures, the comal is handed down from grandmother to mother to daughter, the idea being that a comal tempered over many years of usage will heat faster and cook cleaner.

History
The history of such cooking methods dates back to the pre-Columbian era, when powdered-hominy tortillas were cooked on a comal over an open fire. Comales were also used to toast cacao beans. The word "comal" comes from the Aztec Nahuatl word comalli.

Originally they were thin ceramic pieces, with slightly raised edges. They are found at archaeological sites throughout Central America, with the earliest examples dating to 700 BCE.

See also
 Tava or tawa
 Mitad and mogogo, baking surfaces for Ethiopian injera bread

References

Cooking appliances
Latin American cuisine
Mesoamerican cuisine
Mexican food preparation utensils